Dog with a Blog is an American comedy television series that aired on Disney Channel, premiering on October 12, 2012, and ending on September 25, 2015. The series stars G Hannelius, Blake Michael, Francesca Capaldi, Regan Burns, and Beth Littleford. The series also features the voice of Stephen Full.

Series overview

Episodes

Season 1 (2012–13)

Season 2 (2013–14)

Season 3 (2014–15)

References 

General references 

Lists of American children's television series episodes
Lists of American comedy television series episodes
Lists of Disney Channel television series episodes